104th meridian may refer to:

104th meridian east, a line of longitude east of the Greenwich Meridian
104th meridian west, a line of longitude west of the Greenwich Meridian